is the 22nd studio album by Japanese singer/songwriter Mari Hamada, released on January 13, 2016. Hamada's first new album after a four-year hiatus, it was her final release by Meldac/Tokuma Japan after being with the label for 14 years. The album is offered in two editions: a single CD and a limited edition with a bonus disc.

Mission peaked at No. 11 on Oricon's albums chart and No. 13 on Billboard Japans Hot Albums chart.

Track listing

Personnel 
 Michael Landau – guitar
 Ralph Perucci – guitar
 Hiroyuki Ohtsuki – guitar, bass
 Nozomu Wakai – guitar, keyboards
 Yōichi Fujii – guitar
 Billy Sheehan – bass
 Leland Sklar – bass
 Kōichi Terasawa – bass
 Tomonori "You" Yamada – bass
 Jeff Bova – keyboards
 Takanobu Masuda – keyboards
 Yūichi Matsuzaki – keyboards
 Rei Atsumi – keyboards
 Gregg Bissonette – drums
 Satoshi "Joe" Miyawaki – drums

Charts

References

External links 
  (Mari Hamada)
 Official website (Tokuma Japan)
 
 

2016 albums
Japanese-language albums
Mari Hamada albums
Tokuma Shoten albums